The F.A.L. was a French automobile manufactured in 1907.  A product of Saint-Cloud, the light car was built by Coll'habert et Sénèchal.

References

Defunct motor vehicle manufacturers of France